German submarine U-183 was a Type IXC/40 U-boat of the German Navy (Kriegsmarine) during World War II. She was commissioned on 1 April 1942, one of the first IXC/40 boats, somewhat larger and faster than the IXC type. She began her service life in the 4th U-boat Flotilla, a training organization, moving on to the 2nd, then the 33rd Flotilla, both operational or front outfits.

U-183 was in the first wave of "Monsun boats" or Monsun Gruppe, which operated in the Indian Ocean from Japanese bases in the occupied Dutch East Indies and British Malaya, mostly Penang.

Design
German Type IXC/40 submarines were slightly larger than the original Type IXCs. U-183 had a displacement of  when at the surface and  while submerged. She had two shafts and two  propellers.

U-183 was fitted with six  torpedo tubes (four fitted at the bow and two at the stern), 22 torpedoes, one  SK C/32 naval gun, 180 rounds, and a  SK C/30 as well as a  C/30 anti-aircraft gun. The boat had a complement of forty-eight.

Service history

After serving in the Atlantic, U-183 sailed from France in July 1943, arriving at Penang on 27 October, and operated in the zone for almost two years. She carried out six war patrols, and was sunk on 23 April 1945, 15 days before Germany's surrender, by the American submarine  in the Java Sea. Only one crew member survived.

In November 2013 the wreck of either this submarine or  has been located.

Wolfpacks
U-183 took part in three wolfpacks, namely:
 Luchs (4 – 6 October 1942) 
 Panther (7 – 11 October 1942) 
 Hartherz (3 – 7 February 1943)

Summary of raiding history

References

Bibliography

External links

German Type IX submarines
World War II shipwrecks in the Java Sea
U-boats commissioned in 1942
U-boats sunk in 1945
U-boats sunk by US submarines
Indian Ocean U-Boats
1942 ships
World War II submarines of Germany
Ships built in Bremen (state)
Maritime incidents in April 1945